The Ala-Archa (also Аларча) is a river flowing through Alamüdün District of Chüy Region of Kyrgyzstan. It rises on the northern slopes of Kyrgyz Ala-Too and flows north to enter the river Chu in Chüy Valley. Its water comes mostly from glaciers and snow.

Course

The river runs through Ala Archa National Park and through Bishkek. Other settlements in the river basin are Kashka-Suu, Baytik, Orto-Say, Tash-Döbö and Mayevka.

References

Rivers of Kyrgyzstan
Tian Shan